The Tuscan regional election of 1975 took place on 15 June 1975.

Electoral law 
Election was held under proportional representation with provincial constituencies where the largest remainder method with a Droop quota was used. To ensure more proportionality, remained votes and seats were transferred at regional level and calculated at-large.

Results
The Italian Communist Party was by far the largest party. After the election Lelio Lagorio (Italian Socialist Party), the incumbent President of the Region, formed a new government with the Italian Communist Party. In 1978 Mario Leone, another Socialist, took over from Lagorio.

Source: Ministry of the Interior

References

1975 elections in Italy
1975 regional election
1975
June 1975 events in Europe